Lehsiniya (also spelled Al Hassaniya) is a village in Qatar located in the municipality of Al-Shahaniya. It is near the eastern border with Al Rayyan Municipality.

Etymology
The name "Lehsiniya" originates from the Arabic word "hassan", which translates to "beautiful". It earned this name because of the abundant vegetation found in the area.

Infrastructure
To the south of the village is a shooting range for the Qatar Amiri Guard. A large farm is also maintained in the area.

References

Populated places in Al-Shahaniya